Cultus is a genus of stoneflies in the family Perlodidae. There are about five described species in Cultus.

Species
These five species belong to the genus Cultus:
 Cultus aestivalis (Needham and Claassen, 1925) i c g
 Cultus decisus (Walker, 1852) i c g
 Cultus pilatus (Frison, 1942) i c g
 Cultus tostonus (Ricker, 1952) i c g
 Cultus verticalis (Banks, 1920) i c g b (spiny springfly)
Data sources: i = ITIS, c = Catalogue of Life, g = GBIF, b = Bugguide.net

References

Further reading

 
 

Perlodidae
Articles created by Qbugbot